Pagh's problem is a datastructure problem often used
 when studying lower bounds in computer science named after Rasmus Pagh.
Mihai Pătrașcu was the first to give lower bounds for the problem.
In 2021 it was shown that, given popular conjectures, the naive linear time algorithm is optimal.

Definition 

We are given as inputs  subsets  over a universe .

We must accept updates of the following kind:

After each update, we must output whether the new subset is empty or not.

References 

Problems in computer science